Penelope Grace Garcia is a fictional character portrayed by Kirsten Vangsness on the CBS crime dramas Criminal Minds and its short-lived spin-off Criminal Minds: Suspect Behavior. She is the technical analyst of the Behavioral Analysis Unit that both shows are centered on. She has also made multiple guest appearances on Criminal Minds: Beyond Borders, making her the only character in the franchise to appear in all three of its series.

Life before the BAU
Garcia is from San Francisco, California. A drunk driver killed her parents in a car accident when she was eighteen, and she now helps counsel families of murder victims in her spare time. The character has stated that after her parents died, she dropped out of Caltech and went "underground", but continued to teach herself computer coding. She had been placed on one of the FBI's hacker lists (she was one of a small handful of extremely useful or dangerous hackers in the world), and they recruited her from there. It has also been mentioned, when in one storyline she was not allowed to travel with the team to Langley, that she was on the CIA's "lists" as well. Fellow BAU agent Jennifer Jareau (A.J. Cook) joked that Garcia belonged to that list when she (successfully) tried to hack the CIA for information (namely, Prince William's telephone number) and information on Diana, Princess of Wales' death and other government conspiracies.

Penelope is into online games, specifically MMOGs, as she was once seen playing a game about Camelot on the BAU network, constantly virtually meeting with "Sir Kneighf", an online alter ego who turns out to be serial killer Randall Garner (Charles Haid), who is keeping a young woman prisoner while sending the team several clues that, with tremendous help from agent Spencer Reid (Matthew Gray Gubler), they use to catch him and save the woman. Garner hacked into Garcia's computer and accessed files about the BAU, then used the personal information to find out their whereabouts so he could send the clues there. At the end of the Season 6 episode "Compromising Positions", Supervisory Agent Aaron Hotchner (Thomas Gibson) comments that Garcia submitted her handwritten resume on pink stationery when she applied for a job at the FBI.

The Season 9 episode, "The Black Queen", reveals that Garcia was arrested by the FBI in San Jose, California after she hacked into the computer systems of a cosmetics company, prompted by outrage over its use of animals in product testing. Hotchner offered her a choice of facing prosecution or joining the BAU to help track down serial killers; when she reacted with disdain, he noted her scrupulous morality in choosing targets. Penelope accepted the job and hand-wrote a résumé for Hotchner to give to the FBI's human resources department, using the aforementioned pink stationery that she had in her purse.

Criminal Minds 
Garcia is portrayed as unabashedly emotional, which sometimes makes her job with the BAU more difficult. She has broken down, crying several times while examining the brutal acts of violence that the agency deals with on a daily basis. However, according to Hotchner, she "fills her office with figurines and color to remind herself to smile as the horror fills her screens". Garcia is, on the whole, an optimist. She has managed to remain so, even though the job occasionally requires her to dig into people's secret lives, to "find the god-awful thing that happened to them that made them do the god-awful thing to someone else". Many team members have commented in various ways, that her optimism is an aid to them, that (as Hotchner says) they would never want her to change. 

In the episode "Lucky", Garcia is shot by Jason Clark Battle (Bailey Chase), with whom she went on a date. Garcia survives, but Battle, who turns out to be a serial killer obsessed with becoming a celebrity, continues to stalk her in order to become infamous as the FBI's "archnemesis". When he's seen in the BAU's headquarters, she alerts the rest of the team, which results in Battle taking hostages; Jareau kills him in order to protect the rest of the team. After this incident, Morgan insists that Garcia keep a gun; however, it is never shown whether she took this advice.

Garcia seems to have been the one most hurt by Jareau transferring out of the Behavioral Analysis Unit. In the Season 6 episode "Compromising Positions", Garcia volunteered to replace Jareau as their new Media Liaison, but soon discovered that she was not suited for the job. She returned to her analyst duties after the case was closed, but was given the option to travel to crime scenes with the team as needed.

She is devastated when Agent Emily Prentiss (Paget Brewster) apparently dies in the episode "Lauren" after being stabbed by her nemesis, Ian Doyle (Timothy V. Murphy). In "Hanley Waters", she is interviewed by Hotchner about Prentiss' "death" and says she wants to talk about the times when Prentiss made her happy instead of about her being gone.

Garcia is extremely and emotionally excited when she learns that Prentiss is alive, having faked her death to go into witness protection. She is also quick to forgive her - along with Jareau and Hotchner, who knew the truth - for the deception. It is also revealed that she has been taking care of Prentiss' cat, Sergio, and when Emily inquires about him, Garcia wants visitation rights.

Garcia is afraid of losing loved ones, as she risked her career by taking down a federal website to stop her boyfriend, Kevin Lynch (Nicholas Brendon), from being transferred out of country for a job. Details about why her parents died in a car accident are revealed in Season 7 when Garcia is overseeing a support group and sharing her loss, telling the group they died looking for Garcia after she didn't return home by curfew.

Her moment of truth comes in the Season 9 episode "Demons", when she is forced to shoot an assassin sent to kill Reid by a corrupt sheriff's deputy. Reid had been in the hospital after being shot in the previous episode. In an attempt to get some closure, she communicates with the man she shot while he's on death row and later goes to his execution.

Garcia is especially close to Reid, Jareau, Prentiss, and Derek Morgan (Shemar Moore). She and the latter are best friends, and frequently engage in mock-flirtatious banter while working together on cases. Garcia is godmother of both Jareau's sons and Morgan's son as well. After Morgan's departure and the addition of Luke Alvez (Adam Rodriguez) to the BAU, Garcia becomes uncharacteristically distant and withdrawn from him, frequently calling him 'Newbie.' Later, Alvez and she find some common ground after she discovers that Roxie, who she assumed was Luke's girlfriend, is actually his dog. In the season twelve finale, Morgan returns after serial killer Peter Lewis (Bodhi Elfman) tried to coax out the team and asked Garcia to cut him some slack, despite her reluctance.

In Season 11, Garcia is forced to go into protective custody at the FBI Academy in Quantico, Virginia after the team finds out that a hitman group is targeting her for investigating them. Garcia makes this connection after the team arrests a member of the group who explains their target is "The Dirty Dozen", which Garcia explains refers to the fact she uses twelve botnets to conduct online investigations. The team eventually captures the remaining members of the group during a sting operation in "Entropy".

In Season 13, Garcia ends up going to the field with Agent Matt Simmons (Daniel Henney) to track down Lewis. She also showed that she had not yet been able to overcome the trauma from her shooting. Morgan ended up coming back to give her emotional support.

In the episode, "All You Can Eat", she returns to California to testify at the parole hearing of the man who killed her parents. At first, she wants to make sure he stays in prison, but after a particularly emotional case, she decides to forgive him and does not oppose his release.

She reveals to Alvez in the episode "Saturday", that she has a Russian stalker during a case involving one of her students at a Hacker Workshop at BAU headquarters.

In the Season 15 episode, "Face Off", she reveals that she is considering accepting a job offer at an independent institution. In the final episode, the team celebrates Garcia's departure and Alvez invites her to dinner during her team's farewell party.

Criminal Minds: Suspect Behavior
Garcia also appeared in the spin-off Criminal Minds: Suspect Behavior as a series regular.

Criminal Minds: Beyond Borders
Garcia also appeared in the spin-off Criminal Minds: Beyond Borders. Her first appearance was in season one in a scene with Russ "Monty" Montgomery (Tyler James Williams), who playfully hides Garcia's octopus mug. In July 2016, it was announced that Garcia would make several appearances in season 2.

References

External links

Criminal Minds characters
Fictional Federal Bureau of Investigation personnel
Fictional hackers
Television characters introduced in 2005
Crossover characters in television
Fictional California Institute of Technology people
Fictional characters from San Francisco
American female characters in television
Fictional orphans

sv:Criminal Minds#Huvudpersoner